Lipson & Kaad was an Australian architectural practice working in Sydney from the 1930s until the 1960s. The partners were Samuel Lipson (1901–1995) and Peter Kaad (1898–1967). In Migrant architects practising modern architecture Rebecca Hawcroft states that "the firm became one of the most successful and prominent in the period and designed several of the era’s best buildings". Both partners were influence by the Amsterdam School and in particular the work of Willem Dudok.

Partners

Kaad
Kaad was born on Rotumah, a small Fijian island and was educated at Newington College (1911–1914). He then studied architecture at Sydney Technical College before there was a university architecture course available in Sydney, but also attended architecture lectures in the Engineering Faculty at University of Sydney. His first employment was with the CBC Bank supervising the construction of branches in rural New South Wales. In the mid-1920s he worked with the firm Hall & Prentice (in association with three other young New South Wales Architects: Bruce Dellit, Emil Sodersten and Noel Wilson) designing Brisbane City Hall. The foundation stone was laid in July 1920 by Edward, Prince of Wales (later King Edward VIII/Duke of Windsor), with an opal encrusted 18ct gold and trowel, designed by Peter Kaad. On his return to Sydney he worked with the Commonwealth Works Department. A competition for the design of the Anzac Memorial was commissioned in July 1929 he was awarded third prize. Kaad's major work before his partnership with Lipson was the now demolished Rural Bank in Martin Place, Sydney.

Lipson
Lipson was born in Leeds to Lithuanian Jewish immigrants and studied architecture at the Glasgow School of Arts. He was articled to Honeyman and Keppie. He arrived in Sydney in 1925 with an introduction to John Smith Murdoch the Chief Architect for the Commonwealth of Australia. He first worked in the office of Henry E. White but did not like his movie palace style and went to work with the Commonwealth Department of Works.

Major work

 Hoffnung & Co, now Red Cross House, Clarence Street, Sydney
 Truth Newspaper Building, Sydney and Truth Newspaper Building, Melbourne
Hastings Deering, Crown Street, Woolloomooloo, Sydney
 California Cafe, Macleay Street, Darlinghurst, Sydney
 John Northcott Place, Surry Hills
 The Seabreeze Hotel, Blakehurst, Sydney
 Temple Emanuel and Chevra Kadisha, Woollahra, Sydney
 The United Carpet Mill, Five Dock, Sydney
 Sebel Townhouse Hotel, Elizabeth Bay, Sydney
 The Israeli Embassy, Canberra

Archive
A representative collection of drawings, photographs, files and memorabilia of the firm's work is held by the State Library of New South Wales. Many of the firm's projects were photographed by Max Dupain.

References

Architecture firms of Australia